Aleksander Adolfovich Burba (6 August 1918 – 5 October  1984) was a Soviet organizer of industry and education, a scholar in the field of chemical and metallurgical technologies, Ph.D. (Technology, 1968), Professor (1980), Director of the Mednogorsk Copper-Sulfur Plant (1954–1971), the first Rector (founder) of the Orenburg Polytechnic Institute (1971–1983), now the Orenburg State University. Honorary Citizen of Mednogorsk, Orenburg Oblast (1979).

Biography

Early years 
Aleksander Burba was born in Yenakievo, Yekaterinoslav Governorate, Ukrainian State. His father, a native of Lithuania Adolf Bonifatsievich Burba, was a weighman at the Yenakievo Railway Station. He was awarded on behalf of the Russian Tsar Nicholas II a silver pocket watch with an engraving "To the best weighman of Russia". Burba began working even while still in high school in Rykovo (such was the name of the city of Yenakievo in 1928–1935). For two years he was a teacher of drawing at the same high school, where he studied.

At the University 
In 1936, Burba joined the Rostov State University in Rostov-on-Don and in 1941 graduated from the Chemistry Department. In his student years he worked in 1937–1939 as a teacher of chemistry at the Courses of Industrial Masters in Rostov-on-Don, and since 1940 — as a research assistant at the Hydrochemical Institute of the USSR Academy of Sciences in Novocherkassk, Rostov Oblast. He continued to work at the same Institute after his graduation from the university.

Experience in industry 

After the beginning of the German-Soviet period of the WW II, Burba was ordered to join the defense-connected enterprise in the town of Mednogorsk, Chkalov (now Orenburg) Oblast. In 1941–1954 he worked at the Mednogorsk Copper-Sulfur Plant (MCSP) as Senior Engineer of Research Department, Head of Chemical Workshop, Head of Industrial Engineering Department. Simultaneously, in 1942–1945 he was a teacher at the Industrial School and a supervisor of the industrial training of the students of the Ural Polytechnic Institute. In 1954–1971 he was Director of the Mednogorsk Copper-Sulfur Plant.

In 1968 he obtained an academic degree of Candidate of Technical Sciences (the Russian equivalent of Ph.D.) from the Baykov Institute of Metallurgy of the USSR Academy of Sciences. His dissertation was on the industrial technology of germanium smelting. At that time the production of germanium was classified as a secret one. The same classification has been applied to Burba's dissertation. Due to it his work was never published in full. The scientific consultant of his thesis was David Chizhikov, a corresponding member of the USSR Academy of Sciences.

Development of university education 

In 1971, Burba was appointed the Rector of the just founded Orenburg Polytechnic Institute. To date, this Institute has grown into the Orenburg State University. Burba was also Chairman of the Council of Rectors of the Orenburg region. In 1980 Burba obtained an academic title of Professor in the Department of Chemistry from the Higher Attestation Commission under the USSR Council of Ministers. Since October 1983, after reaching the limiting age for the head of an organization (65 years), he worked as a Head of Department of Chemistry at the Orenburg Polytechnic Institute.

Aleksander Burba died in Orenburg, Russia, USSR and is buried in Mednogorsk, Orenburg Oblast, in the cemetery near Mayak Mountain.

Technological achievements
Burba obtained 29 author's certificates (a form of inventor's recognition formerly available in the USSR) for his inventions in industrial technology. His scientific and technological researches and industrial implementations involve purification of sulphur from impurities, producing of sulphuric acid, metallurgy of non-ferrous metalls, including rare metals (copper, germanium, lead, selenium, etc.), powder metallurgy, cleaning and recycling of wastes of chemical plants, the protection of the environment.

Copper-nickel separation smelting
In 1941–1942 he was one of the leading development engineers of technology of separation smelting (so named top-and-bottom smelting), which resulted in a simultaneous production of both copper and nickel in the water-jacket furnaces at the Mednogorsk Copper-Sulfur Plant. Such process was to replace the previously used one, when only copper was extracted by smelting. This approach was later named a revolutionary step in the non-ferrous metallurgy in Russia.

Production of germanium
In 1956–1960, Burba was a key person in the development of chemical and metallurgical technology for the extraction of germanium and other rare metals. This technology has been introduced into the industrial production at the Mednogorsk Copper-Sulfur Plant. A new Dust Processing Workshop has been founded there to make a complex processing of dust from copper smelting and ashes from the combustion of steam coal. Founding of this workshop is considered to be the largest event in the non-ferrous metallurgy in the 20th century. This workshop brought more than a million rubles yearly income. For the first time in the Soviet Union the production of germanium concentrate from metallurgical dust and coal ashes has been launched on an industrial scale. After that it became possible to cease the import of germanium, a semiconductor metal, which was highly required for the electronics industry.

In 1962 after the initiative and with consultations of Burba a similar production was established at the Angren Chemical and Metallurgical Plant in the city of Angren, Uzbekistan (now  "Angrenenergotsvetmet"). After that, the Soviet Union held the world leadership in the production of germanium. The production was so abundant that up to 40% of it was exported. After the dissolution of the Soviet Union and until the early 2010s the Mednogorsk Copper-Sulfur Plant was the only producer of germanium concentrate in Russia.

Awards and decorations
Orders
     Order of Lenin, twice (1961, 1966) 
  Order of the October Revolution (1971) 
   Order of the Badge of Honour, twice (1957, 1981)

WW II medal
 Medal "For Valiant Labour in the Great Patriotic War 1941-1945" (1946)

Civil medals 
 Medal "For Distinguished Labour" (1954)
 Medal "Veteran of Labour" (1984)
 Medal "For the Development of Virgin Lands" (1957)

Jubilee medals
 Medal "In Commemoration of the 100th Anniversary since the Birth of Vladimir Il'ich Lenin" (1970)
 Medal "Thirty Years of Victory in the Great Patriotic War 1941-1945" (1975)

Honors
 Honorary Citizen of Mednogorsk (1979)
Listed under No.1 in «The Book of Honor» of Orenburg University (1996)

References 
The information in this article is based on that in its Russian equivalent.

1918 births
1984 deaths
Soviet chemical engineers
People from Orenburg
People from Yenakiieve
Soviet metallurgists
Academic staff of Southern Federal University
Recipients of the Order of Lenin
Soviet inventors
Soviet people of Lithuanian descent